The 2010–11 Scottish Football League Third Division (also known as the 2010–11 Irn-Bru Scottish Football League Third Division for sponsorship reasons) was the 16th season in the format of ten teams in the fourth-tier of Scottish football. The season started on 7 August 2011 and ended on 7 May 2011. Arbroath F.C. sealed the title, their first honour in their 133-year history, after a 4-1 win over local rivals Montrose on 23 April 2011.

Teams

Promotion and relegation from 2009–10

Livingston as champions of the 2009–10 season were directly promoted to the 2010–11 Scottish Second Division. Thus completing only a one-year stay in the bottom tier of the Scottish Football League. They were replaced by Clyde who finished bottom of the 2009–10 Scottish Second Division.

A second promotion place was available via a play-off tournament between the ninth-placed team of the 2009–10 Scottish Second Division, Arbroath, and the sides ranked second, third and fourth in the 2009–10 Scottish Third Division, Forfar Athletic, East Stirlingshire and Queen's Park respectively. The play off was won by Forfar Athletic who defeated Arbroath in the final. Arbroath were therefore relegated.

Relegated from Second Division to Third Division

Clyde
Arbroath (via play-offs)

Promoted from Third Division to Second Division

Livingston
Forfar Athletic (via play-offs)

Stadia and locations

A.East Stirlingshire ground shared with Stenhousemuir.

League table

Results
Teams play each other four times in this league. In the first half of the season each team plays every other team twice (home and away) and then do the same in the second half of the season, for a total of 36 games

First half of season

Second half of season

Statistics

Top goalscorers

21 goals
  Gavin Swankie (Arbroath)

17 goals
  Darren Gribben (Berwick Rangers)
  Armand One (Stranraer)

16 goals
  Steven Doris (Arbroath)

14 goals
  Craig Malcolm (Stranraer)
  Ian Harty (Annan Athletic)

13 goals
  Scott Agnew (Stranraer)

Hat-tricks

See also
 Scottish football referee strike

References

External links
2010–11 Scottish Third Division at Soccerway

Scottish Third Division seasons
3
4
Scot

sco:2010–11 Scots Thrid Diveesion